Ben Barnes may refer to:

 Ben Barnes (actor) (born 1981), English actor
 Ben Barnes (Texas politician) (born 1938), American politician and lobbyist in Texas
 Ben Barnes (Shawnee), chief of the Shawnee Tribe, in Oklahoma
 Ben Barnes (Maryland politician) (born 1975), American politician in Maryland